Don Rush is an American ADR director, ADR script writer, voice actor and producer known for his work for ADV Films. As of 2016, Rush currently lives in Houston, Texas with his wife, Max Rush. Rush is now a senior copywriter and marketer.

Voice Roles
Azumanga Daioh - Nakku (Ep. 19), Additional Voices
Azumanga Daioh: The Very Short Movie - Matsuyama
Coyote Ragtime Show - Bonieck, Super Soul
Dragon Knight - The Wheel of Time - Calveros
Full Metal Panic! The Second Raid - Friday, Woo
Full Metal Panic? Fumoffu - Issei Tsubaki, Sameshima (ep.3)
Innocent Venus - Qing Lang
Jinki:Extend - Hideo Koyatani
Martian Successor Nadesico: The Motion Picture - Prince of Darkness - Sawada, Additional Voices
Neo Ranga - Jirou Niimura
Peacemaker Kurogane - Heisuke Toudou
A Tree of Palme - Scruffy, Baron
UFO Ultramaiden Valkyrie - Marduk
Utawarerumono - Derihourai, Dii (Ep. 22)

Production Staff

ADR Director
 Azumanga Daioh (co-directed with Sandra Krasa)
 Coyote Ragtime Show
 Full Metal Panic!
 Full Metal Panic? Fumoffu
 Full Metal Panic!: The Second Raid
 Innocent Venus (Eps. 1-4)
 Kekko Kamen
 Magical Shopping Arcade Abenobashi
 Nanaka 6/17
 Neo Ranga
 Peacemaker
 A Tree of Palme
 UFO Ultramaiden Valkyrie
 Utawarerumono
 Yumeria

Producer
 Azumanga Daioh
 Full Metal Panic!
 Full Metal Panic? Fumoffu
 Kekko Kamen
 Magical Shopping Arcade Abenobashi
 Neo Ranga
 Peacemaker
 A Tree of Palme'''
 YumeriaScript Writer
 Coyote Ragtime Show Full Metal Panic!: The Second Raid Innocent Venus (Eps. 1-4)
 Kekko Kamen Neo Ranga Utawarerumono''

References

External links

Living people
Year of birth missing (living people)
American male voice actors
American voice directors
American television writers
American male screenwriters
American male television writers
American marketing people
American copywriters
ADV Films
Male actors from Houston
Screenwriters from Texas